Melanthia procellata, the pretty chalk carpet, is a moth of the family Geometridae. It is found throughout Europe.

The wingspan is 27–32 mm. The moth flies from May to August .

The caterpillars feed on Clematis vitalba.

Notes
The flight season refers to Belgium and The Netherlands. This may vary in other parts of the range.

External links

Pretty chalk carpet at UKmoths
Fauna Europaea
Lepiforum.de
Vlindernet.nl 

Melanthiini
Moths of Japan
Moths of Europe
Moths of Asia
Taxa named by Michael Denis
Taxa named by Ignaz Schiffermüller